Exocyst complex component 6 is a protein that in humans is encoded by the EXOC6 gene.

Function 

The protein encoded by this gene is highly similar to the Saccharomyces cerevisiae SEC15 gene product, which is essential for vesicular traffic from the Golgi apparatus to the cell surface in yeast. It is one of the components of a multiprotein complex required for exocytosis. The 5' portion of this gene and two neighboring cytochrome p450 genes are included in a deletion that results in an autosomal dominant form of nonsyndromic optic nerve aplasia (ONA). Alternative splicing and the use of alternative promoters results in multiple transcript variants. A paralogous gene encoding a similar protein is present on chromosome 2.

References

Further reading